Heinz Schubert may refer to:

Heinz Schubert (actor) (1925–1999), German actor, drama teacher and photographer
Heinz Schubert (composer) (1908–1945), German composer and conductor
Heinz Schubert (SS officer) (1914–1987), German SS officer, sentenced to death, commuted to 10 years, at the Einsatzgruppen Trial in 1948